Piotr Gierczak  (born 2 May 1976) is a Polish football manager and former player who currently serves as an assistant coach for Górnik Zabrze.

Career
He started out playing for KSZO Ostrowiec Świętokrzyski.

External links
 

1976 births
Living people
People from Ostrowiec Świętokrzyski
Sportspeople from Świętokrzyskie Voivodeship
Association football forwards
Polish footballers
KSZO Ostrowiec Świętokrzyski players
Polonia Bytom players
Górnik Zabrze players
Szczakowianka Jaworzno players
GKS Bełchatów players
Podbeskidzie Bielsko-Biała players
Diagoras F.C. players
Odra Wodzisław Śląski players
Ruch Radzionków players
GKS Katowice players
Ekstraklasa players
I liga players
II liga players
Polish expatriate footballers
Expatriate footballers in Greece
Polish expatriate sportspeople in Greece
Polish football managers